A field mark is a characteristic (e.g. in plumage) useful for species identification, usually birds.  They are often used in field guides or identification keys.  In a broader context, a field mark might be referred to as a character (e.g. "differential character" or "diagnostic character"). For birds this may include plumage, flight characteristics, proportions, voice, behaviour, etc., i.e., all characteristics that help identification. As opposed to in-hand marks, distinguishable when a specimen is held in the hand, field marks are especially those marks that remain useful in less than optimal conditions, for example when the subject is far removed, only partly visible or not sufficiently lit to see its colours.

References 
 http://www.allaboutbirds.org/NetCommunity/Page.aspx?pid=1053
 http://www.backyardnature.net/birdmark.htm

Wild animals identification
Birdwatching